The 2014 Manila Mavericks season is the inaugural season of the franchise playing in the International Premier Tennis League (IPTL).

Season recap

Founding of franchise
On 21 January 2014, IPTL announced that one of the charter franchises for the league's inaugural 2014 season would be based in Bangkok.

Inaugural draft
The Bangkok franchise (as the Mavericks were still known at the time) participated in the IPTL inaugural draft on 2 March 2014, in Dubai, United Arab Emirates. Players selected by Bangkok were

Move to Manila
On 10 May 2014, before the founder and owner of the franchise had been revealed to the general public, IPTL announced that the Bangkok franchise would be moved to Manila, Philippines due to political unrest in Thailand. On 19 June 2014, IPTL introduced Francis Lumen as the owner of the Manila franchise. The ownership group that moved the team to Manila comprises Filipinos Hans T. Sy, Jean Henri D. Lhuillier, Kevin Belmonte and Haresh Hiranand along with Bala Swaminathan. Sy is president of SM Prime Holdings, inc., the largest shopping mall and retail operator in the Philippines. Lhuillier is an entrepreneur and diplomat. He is president and chief executive officer of P.J. Lhuillier Incorporated, a conglomerate in the pawnbroker, financial services, retail, hotel and restaurant management, information technology, sports, and real estate industries. Lhuillier is also the honorary consul general of San Marino to the Philippines.

Team name
By June 2014, the Manila franchise had been named the Manila Mavericks.

Home venue
On 23 July 2014, the Mavericks announced that their home matches would be played at Smart Araneta Coliseum in Quezon City, Metro Manila. On 29 August 2014, IPTL announced that the Mall of Asia Arena in Pasay, Metro Manila, the first choice as a home for the Mavericks, had opened up the dates of the team's home matches making it possible for the Mavericks to play there.

Maria Sharapova and Treat Huey join the team
On 23 July 2014, the Mavericks announced that they had signed Maria Sharapova to replace Victoria Azarenka who would be unable to play for the team due to an ankle injury. The Mavericks also signed the top-ranked Filipino player Treat Huey.

First coach
On 27 October 2014, Treat Huey was named the Mavericks' first coach.

Event chronology
 21 January 2014: IPTL announced that one of the charter franchises for the league inaugural 2014 season would be in Bangkok.
 2 March: The Bangkok franchise participated in the IPTL inaugural draft.
 10 May: IPTL announced that the Bangkok franchise would move to Manila.
 25 June: The Manila franchise is named the Manila Mavericks.
 23 July: The Mavericks announced that their home matches would be played at Smart Araneta Coliseum in Quezon City, Metropolitan Manila.
 23 July: The Mavericks announced that they had signed Maria Sharapova to replace the injured Victoria Azarenka.
 23 July: The Mavericks announced that they had signed Treat Huey.
 29 August: The Mavericks announced a change in their home venue from Smart Araneta Coliseum to Mall of Asia Arena in Pasay, Metropolitan Manila.
 27 October: Treat Huey was named the Mavericks' first coach.
 28 November: The Mavericks opened their inaugural season with a 29–24 loss at home to the UAE Royals.
 30 November: The Mavericks earned their first victory in franchise history with a 27–19 home win over the Singapore Slammers.

Match log

{| align="center" border="1" cellpadding="2" cellspacing="1" style="border:1px solid #aaa"
|-
! colspan="2" style="background:#0038A8; color:#FCD116" | Legend
|-
! bgcolor="ccffcc" | Mavericks Win
! bgcolor="ffbbbb" | Mavericks Loss
|-
! colspan="2" | Home team in CAPS(including coin-flip winners)
|}

Key: MS = men's singles; MD = men's doubles; WS = women's singles; MXD = mixed doubles; LS = legends' singles; OT = overtime (additional games played in extended fifth sets); SO = men's singles super shoot-out

Roster
Reference:

  Treat Huey – Player-Coach
  Victoria Azarenka – injured, did not play
  Kirsten Flipkens
  Carlos Moyá
  Andy Murray
  Daniel Nestor
  Maria Sharapova 
  Jo-Wilfried Tsonga

Television coverage
Television coverage in the Philippines of Mavericks matches was provided by ABS-CBN.

See also

References

External links
Manila Mavericks official website
International Premier Tennis League official website

Manila Mavericks 2014
Manila Mavericks season
2014 in Philippine sport